Maculileiopus is a genus of beetles in the family Cerambycidae, containing the following species:

 Maculileiopus kalshoveni Breuning, 1957
 Maculileiopus maculipennis Breuning, 1958

References

Acanthocinini
Taxa named by Stephan von Breuning (entomologist)